Prostanthera granitica, commonly known as the granite mintbush, is a species of flowering plant in the family Lamiaceae and is endemic to eastern Australia. It is a spreading shrub with egg-shaped leaves with the edges rolled under, and purple to violet flowers.

Description
Flowering occurs from August to December.

Taxonomy
Prostanthera granitica was first formally described in 1905 by Joseph Maiden and Ernst Betche in the Proceedings of the Linnean Society of New South Wales.

Distribution and habitat
Granite mint bush grows in heath and forest in rocky places, mainly on the tablelands, slopes and plains of New South Wales.

References

granitica
Flora of New South Wales
Flora of Queensland
Lamiales of Australia
Plants described in 1905
Taxa named by Joseph Maiden
Taxa named by Ernst Betche